All for a Girl is a 1916 American silent comedy film featuring Oliver Hardy.

Plot
Plump (Oliver Hardy) and Runt (Billy Ruge) are both interested in the same girl, Elsie.  She agrees to marry the suitor who obtains the better job opportunity.

Cast
 Oliver Hardy as Plump (as Babe Hardy)
 Billy Ruge as Runt
 Elsie MacLeod as Elsie

See also
 List of American films of 1916
 Oliver Hardy filmography

References

External links

1916 films
1916 short films
American silent short films
Silent American comedy films
American black-and-white films
1916 comedy films
American comedy short films
1910s American films